José "King" Roman (born December 17, 1946) is a Puerto Rican former boxer who was Puerto Rico's first world heavyweight championship challenger. He is known as "Joe King Roman." He holds notable victories over Manuel Ramos and ex-Light Heavyweight champion Vicente Rondon.

Pro career
In Roman's early career, he achieved mixed results. He defeated people like Jack O'Halloran and Chuck Wepner but lost to Jack Bodell. After the Bodell loss, Roman had a win-streak, defeating O'Halloran once again and besting Manuel Ramos. He lost to Robie Harris but put together a streak of wins before fighting George Foreman.

Foreman Fight 
In late August 1973, he travelled to Tokyo, Japan to challenge world Heavyweight champion George Foreman, losing by a knockout in the first round there on September 1. Roman's corner protested that he was hit by Foreman while Roman was down, although no action was taken on this complaint. Even though he lost, he made history by becoming the first Puerto Rican to challenge for the world's Heavyweight championship. The only fellow Puerto Ricans to challenge for the heavyweight championship are Ossie Ocasio, Fres Oquendo and John Ruiz, who later became the first Latino to hold a version of the heavyweight championship.

Afterwards 
Roman took held a win over former WBA world Light Heavyweight champion Vicente Rondon just after the Foreman fight, his first win afterwards. In 1975 he lost to Mike Quarry and later in the year he began a series of losses. He lost seven times, notably losing to Jimmy Young. Roman was defeated by Boone Kirkman afterwards, in 1977, but never achieved a notable fight afterwards, having a mixed record.

Retirement
Roman retired in 1981 with a record of 54 wins, 27 losses and 4 draws, with 27 knockout wins. He used to work at a Sweetbay Supermarket in Tampa, Florida. Ossie Ocasio and Fres Oquendo also challenged for the world's heavyweight championship, both are also from Puerto Rico. Ruiz was born in the USA of Puerto Rican ancestry.

Professional boxing record

See also

List of Puerto Ricans
Sports in Puerto Rico

References

External links
 

1946 births
Living people
People from Vega Baja, Puerto Rico
Puerto Rican male boxers
Heavyweight boxers